Pholaseius is a genus of mites in the Phytoseiidae family.

Species
 Pholaseius colliculatus Beard, 2001

References

Phytoseiidae